The 2021 GB3 Championship, known as the 2021 BRDC British Formula 3 Championship until August 2021, was a motor racing championship for open wheel, formula racing cars held across England. The 2021 season was the sixth organised by the British Racing Drivers' Club in the United Kingdom. The championship featured a mix of professional motor racing teams and privately funded drivers, and also featured the 2-litre 230-bhp Tatuus-Cosworth single seat race car in the main series. The season ran over eight triple- and quadruple-header rounds, it started on 22 May at Brands Hatch and ended on 17 October at Donington Park. The series was rebranded mid-season from BRDC British Formula 3 Championship.

Zak O'Sullivan took the drivers' championship at the final round at Donington Park, as Carlin took the inaugural teams' championship.

Teams and drivers 
All teams were British-registered.

Race calendar and results 
The provisional calendar was revealed on 15 October 2020. After being cancelled because of the COVID-19 pandemic in 2020, the round at Spa-Francorchamps returned to the series. The series supported the British GT Championship at seven of its eight meetings. The calendar was slightly changed later on to ensure eight rounds could be run.

Championship standings 

 Scoring system

Points were awarded to the top 20 classified finishers in races one and two, with the third race awarding points to only the top 15. Race three, which had its grid formed by reversing the qualifying order, awarded extra points for positions gained from the drivers' respective starting positions.

 Notes

 1 2 3 refers to positions gained and thus extra points earned during race three.

Drivers' championship

Teams' championship 
2021 saw the introduction of a teams' championship, with each team counting its two best results of every race.

Notes

External links

References 

BRDC British Formula 3 Championship seasons
GB3
GB3